The Domestic Violence, Crime and Victims Act 2004 (c 28) is an Act of the Parliament of the United Kingdom. It is concerned with criminal justice and concentrates upon legal protection and assistance to victims of crime, particularly domestic violence. It also expands the provision for trials without a jury, brings in new rules for trials for causing the death of a child or vulnerable adult, and permits bailiffs to use force to enter homes.

Origins
The Act's provisions originated in several reports:

 The Home Office White Paper Justice for All (Cm 5563) - many of whose recommendations were implemented in the Criminal Justice Act 2003
 The Home Office consultation paper Safety and Justice: the Government's Proposals on Domestic Violence (Cm 5847), published in June 2003
 The Home Office policy leaflet "A Better Deal for Victims and Witnesses", published on 21 November 2002
 National Society for the Protection of Children ("NSPCC") "Which of you did it?" Working Group Report, published in Autumn 2003
 The Law Commission report: Children: their non-accidental death or serious injury (criminal trials) (LC282), published on 16 September 2003
 The Law Commission consultative report Children: their non-accidental death or serious injury (criminal trials) - a consultative report (LC279), published on 15 April 2003
 The Law Commission report: [The Effective Prosecution of Multiple Offending] (LC277), published in October 2002
 The Law Commission report: Double Jeopardy and Prosecution Appeals (LC267), published on the 6 March 2001

Reforms to police and court procedure

Non-molestation orders
Non-molestation orders under the Family Law Act 1996 were amended to provide a criminal sanction for non-compliance, with a maximum sentence of 5 years' imprisonment. The circumstances in which such orders could be imposed was extended to include same-sex couples and cohabiting couples on an equal footing with married couples. Former cohabitants are also included.

Restraining orders
Restraining orders (preventing the recipient from doing anything specified in the order) can be imposed upon acquitted defendants. They are imposed if the court "considers it necessary to do so to protect a person from harassment by the defendant". The Court of Appeal in allowing an appeal against conviction may also remit the matter to the Crown Court to consider a restraining order in respect of the otherwise successful appellant.

Common assault
The Act deemed common assault an arrestable offence. The practical effect of this change was that the police could arrest a suspect at the scene without a warrant, rather than potentially be compelled to leave the suspected assailant with his or her alleged victim. Previously the police would have to allege  assault occasioning actual bodily harm, which was arrestable, in order to detain the suspected assailant in borderline cases.

However, the concept of "arrestable offence" was abolished on 1 January 2006. , police can effect an arrest, even in the case of suspected common assault, in order "to prevent the person in question causing physical injury to himself or any other person."

The Act specified common assault as an alternative verdict to a count on an aggravated assault in the Crown Court, though it is not itself an indictable offence.

Fitness to plead
Judges, not a specially empanelled jury, now decide if a defendant is fit to plead.". The regime for dealing with defendants who are unfit to plead or not guilty by reason of insanity (that is, committed the physical acts constituting the offence but without the sane intent) has also been modified. The court, not the Home Secretary, makes the assessment (requiring medical evidence to do so) whether the defendant should be committed to a psychiatric hospital.

Trial by jury of sample counts only
Trials with a substantial number of charges can now be split into two phases: trial by jury of "specimen counts" and judge-only trial of the remaining counts. This further expands the circumstances in which trials can be heard without a jury (see the Criminal Justice Act 2003).

The prosecution must satisfy the court that three conditions are met:
 given the number of counts, a trial by jury involving all of them would be impracticable
 each count or group of counts to be tried by a jury can be regarded as a sample of counts for judge-only trial
 it is in the interests of justice

The judge should take into account any ways that jury trial can be made easier, but no such measure should result in a trial where the defendant faces a lesser sentence than would be available with the new measures.

Causing or allowing the death of a child or vulnerable adult

Previous difficulties with the law
An intractable legal problem had arisen in relation to cases where a child or vulnerable adult cared for by two people dies as a result of ill-treatment. It is known that at least one of two people is responsible, but not which. This problem had been analysed in a number of cases. The Court of Appeal in Lane v Lane held that neither person could be convicted, nor the trial proceed past the end of the prosecution case, because there was no evidence specifically pointing to a certain defendant.
Lord Goddard earlier commented in Regina v Abbott "Probably one or other must have committed it, but there was not evidence which, and although it is unfortunate that a guilty party cannot be brought to
justice, it is far more important that there should not be a miscarriage of justice and that the law maintained that the prosecution should prove its case."
The Law Commission's report commented that this meant one or other parent were potentially "getting away with murder".

The Act deals with the problem in two ways: firstly by creating an offence of "causing or allowing the death of a child or vulnerable adult", and secondly by amending the rules of court procedure to require joint defendants to give their account of events in the witness box, effectively forcing them to incriminate the other if appropriate.

The new offence
The offence of "causing or allowing the death of a child or vulnerable adult", now referred to as the "new offence", is committed under section 5 of the Act if the following four conditions apply:
 A child or vulnerable adult dies as a result of an unlawful act of a person in the "same household"
 The defendant was also member of the same household, with frequent contact with the victim, and present at the time of the unlawful act
 There was a risk of serious physical harm to the victim at the time
 Either:
 The defendant did the unlawful act (that is, directly caused the death), or
 Was aware of the risk (or ought to have been), didn't take reasonable steps to do anything about it, and foresaw the circumstances which led up to the unlawful act causing death

Therefore if it can be established that a child or vulnerable adult died as a result of an unlawful act, it need not be proved which of the two responsible members of the household either caused the death or allowed it to happen.

If there was no obvious history of violence, or any reason to suspect it, then the other members of the household would not be guilty of this offence, even in clear cases of homicide. Where there is no reason to suspect the victim is at risk, other members of the household cannot reasonably be expected to have taken steps to prevent the abuse.

New procedure
Court procedure is amended to restrict the circumstances in which the trial can be stopped at the end of the prosecution case and before the defence case.

The ambit of the "adverse inference" (right of the jury to make assumptions about any part of the case, including the guilt of the defendant, based upon his or her failure to answer any question put in court) is extended to include an inference on a joint charge of homicide (murder and manslaughter) and the new offence; this means that if a person is charged with either (or both) homicide offences and this new offence, then silence in the witness box can imply guilt of homicide as well as the new offence. This is subject to the usual safeguard that a person cannot be convicted solely upon the basis of their silence.

The point at which a "no case to answer" submission (see definition) can be made has in certain circumstances been moved to the end of the whole case, not just the prosecution. Joint charges of homicide and the new offence can only be dismissed at the end of the whole case (if the new offence has survived past that stage as well).

The new offence will survive the "no case to answer" test as long as the fundamentals of the offence are demonstrated - the prosecution do not have to show whether the defendant caused or allowed the death to happen. The defendant will be under pressure to give evidence about what occurred - not to do so would result in the adverse inference being drawn.

Criticism 

A number of issues have been pointed out by legal scholars with the current drafting. David Ormerod, writing in the criminal law textbook Smith and Hogan, notes that the Act deliberately does not define what counts as a "household". Additionally, the Act does not adequately cover some classes of carers who do not live in a household residence but have regular contact—domestic nannies, for instance. The law also leaves unclear whether one carer is legally responsible for not taking steps to protect a vulnerable victim from the risky behaviour of another of his or her carers.

Bailiff powers
The Act permits bailiffs to use force to enter homes, overturning a centuries-old doctrine, confirmed by Semayne's case (1604), that "an Englishman's home is his castle". This had been described in the eighteenth century by William Blackstone, who wrote in Book 4, Chapter 16 of his Commentaries on the Laws of England:

In 2009 charities providing advice to debtors said they were seeing bailiffs threatening to break in unless the debtor paid the full fine immediately, as well court and bailiff costs. Previously, charities had been able to advise debtors that bailiffs did not have the right to force entry, and the fine could be referred back to the courts and affordable payment schedules worked out.

Section 60 - Commencement
The following orders have been made under this section:
The Domestic Violence, Crime and Victims Act 2004 (Commencement No. 1) Order 2005 (S.I. 2005/579 (C. 26))
The Domestic Violence, Crime and Victims Act 2004 (Commencement No. 2) Order 2005 (S.I. 2005/1705 (C. 71))
The Domestic Violence, Crime and Victims Act 2004 (Commencement No. 3) Order 2005 (S.I. 2005/1821 (C. 77))
The Domestic Violence, Crime and Victims Act 2004 (Commencement No. 4) Order 2005 (S.I. 2005/2848 (C. 119))
The Domestic Violence, Crime and Victims Act 2004 (Commencement No. 5) Order 2005 (S.I. 2005/3196 (C. 137))
The Domestic Violence, Crime and Victims Act 2004 (Commencement No. 6) Order 2006 (S.I. 2006/2662 (C. 90))
The Domestic Violence, Crime and Victims Act 2004 (Commencement No. 7 and Transitional Provision) Order 2006 (S.I. 2006/3423 (C. 131))
The Domestic Violence, Crime and Victims Act 2004 (Commencement No. 8) Order 2007 (S.I. 2007/602 (C. 26))
The Domestic Violence, Crime and Victims Act 2004 (Commencement No. 9 and Transitional Provisions) Order 2007 (S.I. 2007/1845 (C. 69))
The Domestic Violence, Crime and Victims Act 2004 (Commencement No. 10) Order 2008 (S.I. 2008/3065 (C. 131))
The Domestic Violence, Crime and Victims Act 2004 (Commencement No. 11) Order 2009 (S.I. 2009/2501 (C. 104))
The Domestic Violence, Crime and Victims Act 2004 (Commencement No. 12) Order 2009 (S.I. 2009/2616 (C. 117))
The Domestic Violence, Crime and Victims Act 2004 (Commencement No. 13) Order 2010 (S.I. 2010/129 (C. 16))
The Domestic Violence, Crime and Victims Act 2004 (Commencement No. 14) Order 2011 (S.I. 2011/1008 (C. 41))

See also
Outline of domestic violence

References

External links
 65-yr-old mother gets justice under Domestic Violence Act

UK Legislation 

United Kingdom Acts of Parliament 2004
Domestic violence